40,000 Years of Dreaming (White Fellas Dreaming: A Century of Australian Cinema) is an hour-long documentary film presented by George Miller and produced by the British Film Institute, as part of its Century of Cinema series.

The film is mainly a collage of various pieces of Australian film, past and present, including Miller's own Mad Max series. Miller focuses primarily on Australian cinema as a vessel of public Dreaming, creating a link between contemporary Australian cinema and the Dreamtime lores from a variety of Aboriginal Australian groups.  Miller also places Australian cinema in the context of Joseph Campbell's monomyth concept.

It has been out of print since its release in 1997, along with several of the other films in the Century of Cinema series, apart from Martin Scorsese's feature. It has occasionally been aired on television.

References

External links
 

1997 films
Films directed by George Miller
British documentary films
History of film
1990s English-language films
1997 documentary films
Documentary films about the cinema of Australia
1990s British films